Vitronectin (VTN or VN) is a glycoprotein of the hemopexin family which is abundantly found in serum, the extracellular matrix and bone. In humans it is encoded by the VTN gene.

Vitronectin binds to integrin alpha-V beta-3 and thus promotes cell adhesion and spreading. It also inhibits the membrane-damaging effect of the terminal cytolytic complement pathway and binds to several serpins (serine protease inhibitors). It is a secreted protein and exists in either a single chain form or a clipped, two chain form held together by a disulfide bond.  Vitronectin has been speculated to be involved in hemostasis and tumor malignancy.

Structure 

Vitronectin is a 54 kDa glycoprotein, consisting of 478 amino acid residues. About one-third of the protein's molecular mass is composed of carbohydrates. On occasion, the protein is cleaved after arginine 379, to produce two-chain vitronectin, where the two parts are linked by a disulfide bond. No high-resolution structure has been determined experimentally yet, 
except for the N-terminal domain.

The protein consists of three domains: 
 The N-terminal Somatomedin B domain (1-39)
 A central domains with hemopexin homology (131-342)
 A C-terminal domain (residues 347-459) also with hemopexin homology.

Several structures has been reported for the Somatomedin B domain. The protein was initially crystallized in complex with one of its physiological binding partners: the Plasminogen activator inhibitor-1 (PAI-1) and the structure solved for this complex. Subsequently two groups reported NMR structures of the domain.

The somatomedin B domain is a close-knit disulfide knot, with 4 disulfide bonds within 35 residues. Different disulfide configurations had been reported for this domain but this ambiguity has been resolved by the crystal structure.

Homology models have been built for the central and C-terminal domains.

Function 

The somatomedin B domain of vitronectin binds to plasminogen activator inhibitor-1 (PAI-1), and stabilizes it. Thus vitronectin serves to regulate proteolysis initiated by plasminogen activation. In addition, vitronectin is a component of platelets and is, thus, involved in hemostasis. Vitronectin contains an RGD (45-47) sequence, which is a binding site for membrane-bound integrins, e.g., the vitronectin receptor, which serve to anchor cells to the extracellular matrix. The Somatomedin B domain interacts with the urokinase receptor, and this interaction has been implicated in cell migration and signal transduction. High plasma levels of both PAI-1 and the urokinase receptor have been shown to correlate with a negative prognosis for cancer patients. Cell adhesion and migration are directly involved in cancer metastasis, which provides a probable mechanistic explanation for this observation.

References

Further reading

External links 
 

Glycoproteins
Extracellular matrix proteins
Cell adhesion proteins